B. acaulis may refer to:

 Brassavola acaulis, an orchid species in the genus Brassavola
 Brunoniella acaulis, a plant species in the genus Brunoniella found in  Australia